John Mockler may refer to:

 John Mockler (politician) (born 1941), California state official
 John Mockler (hurler) (1866–?), Irish hurler